Varsenare is a town in Jabbeke, part of Flanders and Belgium. Its postal code is 8490.

See also
West Flanders

External links
 
Varsenare @ City Review

Populated places in West Flanders